WWYN (106.9 FM), known as "WYN 106-9", is a country music radio station based in McKenzie, Tennessee. WWYN is owned by Thomas Media and is currently the top rated radio station in the West Tennessee area.

WWYN serves Jackson, Tennessee, and all of West Tennessee with an ERP of 100,000 Watts. WWYN's sister stations are WHHM (Star 107.7), WFKX (96 KIX), and WZDQ (102.3 The Rocket). WWYN once branded itself as "WYN107". Cities in WWYN primary coverage area include: Mayfield and Murray Kentucky, Jackson, Lexington, Paris, Union City, Dyersburg, Brownsville, Bolivar, Savannah, and Henderson Tennessee.

External links
 WWYN official website
 

WYN
Country radio stations in the United States